The 1982 Avon Championships of Dallas was a women's tennis tournament played on indoor carpet courts at the Moody Coliseum in Dallas, Texas that was part of the 1982 Virginia Slims World Championship Series. It was the 11th edition of the tournament and was held from March 8 through March 14, 1982. Top-seeded Martina Navratilova won the singles title and earned $35,000 first-prize money.

Finals

Singles
 Martina Navratilova defeated  Mima Jaušovec 6–3, 6–2
 It was Navratilova's fifth singles title of the year and the 60th of her career.

Doubles
 Martina Navratilova /  Pam Shriver defeated  Billie Jean King /  Ilana Kloss 6–4, 6–4

Prize money

References

External links
 International Tennis Federation (ITF) tournament edition details

Avon Championships of Dallas
Virginia Slims of Dallas
Avon Championships of Dallas
Avon Championships of Dallas
Dallas
Avon Championships of Dallas